Captal (Lat. capitalis, first, chief ), was a medieval feudal title in Gascony. According to Du Cange the designation captal (capital, captau, capitau) was applied loosely to the more illustrious nobles of Aquitaine, counts, viscounts, etc., probably as capitales domini, principal lords, though he quotes more fanciful explanations.

As an actual title the word was used only by the lords of Trene, Puychagut, Epernon and Buch (a lordship being an amalgamation of two or more seigniories).

It is best known in connection with the famous soldier, Jean III de Grailly, captal de Buch KG (d. 1376), the captal de Buch par excellence, immortalized by Froissart as the confidant of the Black Prince and the champion of the English cause against France. His active part in the war began in 1364, when he ravaged the country between Paris and Rouen, but was beaten by Bertrand du Guesclin at Cocherel and taken prisoner. Released next year, he received the seigniory of Nemours and took the oath of fealty to the French king, Charles V, but soon resigned his new fief and returned to his allegiance to the English king. In 1367 he took part in the battle of Navarette, in which Du Guesclin was taken prisoner, the captal being entrusted with his safe-keeping. In 1371 Jean de Grailly was appointed constable of Aquitaine, but was taken prisoner next year and interned in the Temple at Paris where, resisting all the tempting offers of the French king, he remained till his death five years later.

References

Titles